Susan Phillips is an Australian architect. In 2014 she received the Sir James Irwin President's Medal from the Australian Institute of Architects (SA).

Background 

Phillips trained at the University of Adelaide between 1976 and 1980.  Upon graduation she worked for both Lester, Firth & Murton and Hassell, where she undertook the first extensive survey of Leigh Street in central Adelaide.

Between 1981 and 1984 she worked on the New Parliament House in Canberra, at the offices of Romaldo Giurgola, who became a key influence.

Practice 

Phillips set up Phillips/Pilkington Architects in 1992 with Michael Pilkington, locating their office in their own house, the recently completed Kensington Townhouses.

The practice has continued to work on public and educational projects. The practice is currently located in the local heritage listed former offices of Dickson and Platten in North Adelaide.

Significant and awarded projects the practice has completed include the Port Pirie Regional Tourism and Arts Centre (the office's first major commission), the Mildura and District Education Council (2007) and the Seymour College Performing Arts Centre (2009). Key collaborations the practice have been involved in include the widely recognised Marion Cultural Centre (2001), with ARM Architecture, the University Of Adelaide Plant Accelerator, 2009 with
H2o Architects and the Jeffrey Smart Building with John Wardle Architects (2014).

References

External links 
 Phillips Pilkington Architects

Australian women architects
Living people
1958 births
South Australian architects
21st-century Australian architects
20th-century Australian architects
20th-century Australian women
21st-century Australian women